L-745,870 is a drug which acts as a dopamine receptor antagonist selective for the D4 subtype, and has antipsychotic effects in animal models, though it was not effective in human trials.

References

D4 antagonists
Pyrrolopyridines
Phenylpiperazines
Chloroarenes